State Road 583 (NM 583) is a  state highway in the US state of New Mexico. NM 583's southern terminus is at NM 76 in Santa Cruz, and the northern terminus is at NM 68 in Espanola.

Major intersections

See also

References

583
Transportation in Santa Fe County, New Mexico
Transportation in Rio Arriba County, New Mexico